The women's 4 × 400 metres relay event at the 2008 Olympic Games took place on 22 and 23 August at the Beijing Olympic Stadium.

There were only 16 NOCs competing at this event. These 16 NOCs were selected by the average of the two best marks at the qualifying period.

In 2016, it was announced that a reanalysis of samples from the 2008 Summer Olympics resulted in a doping violation by Tatyana Firova. Accordingly, the Russian team was disqualified, and the Russian team were stripped of their 4 × 400 m relay silver medals. 4th placed Belarus was also disqualified due to a doping violation by anchor runner Sviatlana Vusovich. Medals of the other teams have been reallocated by the IAAF. Another Russian relay team member, Tatyana Firova, also failed her drug test and was disqualified.

Records
Prior to this competition, the existing world and Olympic records were as follows.

No new world or Olympic records were set for this event.

Qualification summary

Results
All times shown are in seconds.
Q denotes automatic qualification.
q denotes fastest losers.
DNS denotes did not start.
DNF denotes did not finish.
DQ denotes disqualified
AR denotes area record.
NR denotes national record.
PB denotes personal best.
SB denotes season's best.

Round 1
First 3 in each heat (Q) and the next 2 fastest (q) advance to the Final.

Final

References

 
 Heat 1 Results
 Heat 2 Results

Athletics at the 2008 Summer Olympics
Relay foot races at the Olympics
Olympics 2008
2008 in women's athletics
Women's events at the 2008 Summer Olympics